Korra is a village in the Kuchai tehsil, Pashchimi Singhbhum district, Jharkhand state, India.

References

Villages in West Singhbhum district